Khati is a carpenter caste found primarily in Haryana. They are classified as an OBC caste, and use Jangra/Jangir title. Not all Jangra/ Jangir are khati, some are bramhin and some are Vishwakarma too.

References

Indian castes
Social groups of Haryana
Social groups of Delhi